Kenneth Armstrong Kilrea (January 16, 1919 – January 14, 1990) was a Canadian ice hockey player who played 91 games in the National Hockey League with the Detroit Red Wings between 1939 and 1944. He was born in Ottawa, Ontario. Ken was the brother of Hec Kilrea and Wally Kilrea and the uncle of Brian Kilrea.

Career statistics

Regular season and playoffs

External links
 

1919 births
1990 deaths
Buffalo Bisons (AHL) players
Canadian expatriate ice hockey players in the United States
Canadian ice hockey left wingers
Detroit Red Wings players
Fort Worth Rangers players
Ice hockey people from Ottawa
Indianapolis Capitals players
Johnstown Jets players
New Haven Ramblers players
Ottawa Senators (QSHL) players
Philadelphia Rockets players
Pittsburgh Hornets players
Springfield Indians players